Vernā Myers is an American diversity consultant , author, speaker, lawyer, and corporate executive in her role as the Vice President of Inclusion Strategy at Netflix. Vernā gave a TED talk in 2014 called "How to Overcome Our Biases? Walk Boldly Toward Them."

Early life and education 
Myers was raised in Baltimore, Maryland. She later moved to New York City to attend Barnard College of Columbia University's undergraduate program receiving a Bachelor of Arts, magna cum laude in Political Science. Upon graduation, she moved to Boston, Massachusetts to attend Harvard Law School, receiving her Juris Doctor degree in 1985.

Career 
In 1992, Myers was appointed the first executive director of the Boston Law Firm Group (now the Boston Lawyers Group), a consortium of firms and corporate legal departments. She also served as deputy chief of staff for the Attorney General of Massachusetts. Vernā practiced corporate and real estate law in Boston at Testa, Hurwitz & Thibeault, LLP and Fitch, Wiley, Richlin & Tourse, LLP.

In 2014, Myers spoke on the subject of "unconscious bias" in her TED talk, "How to Overcome Our Biases? Walk Boldly Toward Them," which she gave at a TEDx event in Boston on November 15. She has also given talks on unconscious bias to organizations such as Cleveland Metropolitan Bar, NASA, and the Massachusetts Women's Conference.

Myers has been interviewed by television news networks such as WCVB News, MPR News, and CNN. Myers  also founded the OPUS Conference, a conference centered on race and ethnicity at large law firms and corporations. She also authored two books, Moving Diversity Forward: How to Go From Well-Meaning to Well-Doing, and What If I Say the Wrong Thing?: 25 Habits for Culturally Effective People.

In 2018, Vernā filled the inaugural role as VP, Inclusion Strategy at Netflix She has developed the overall culture at Netflix, including inclusion frameworks for casting and production crew hiring on programs such as Bridgerton.

In 2021, Myers and Arianna Huffington joined to provide training courses on LinkedIn Learning about diversity.

Her quote "Diversity is being invited to the Party, Inclusion is being asked to dance" has been widely used by various organizations and in the press, such as by OMD, SHRM, and Academy of Eating Disorders.

Select speaking engagements 

 2016, featured speaker at Big Ideas for the 2016 Public Library Association conference
 2018, Keynote at Baltimore's Light City
 2018, Keynote at SXSW Conference & Festivals
 2022, panelist at Variety's Changemakers Summit

Bibliography

References 

1966 births
Living people
American lawyers
21st-century American women writers
21st-century American non-fiction writers
Barnard College alumni
Harvard Law School alumni